Kambaitimyia is a genus of parasitic flies in the family Tachinidae.

Species
 Kambaitimyia carbonata Mesnil, 1953
 Kambaitimyia rufipes Mesnil, 1957

References

Dexiinae
Tachinidae genera
Diptera of Asia